Shigetaka (written: 重孝, 重昂 or 茂高) is a masculine Japanese given name. Notable people with the name include:

, Japanese samurai
, Japanese naval aviator
Shigetaka Sasaki, Canadian judoka
, Japanese magazine editor
, Japanese physicist and medical researcher

See also
Shigetaka Kashiwagi's Top Water Bassing, a Super Famicom fishing video game

Japanese masculine given names